The men's taijiquan competition at the 1998 Asian Games in Bangkok, Thailand was held on 16 December at the Thammasat Gymnasium 6.

Schedule
All times are Indochina Time (UTC+07:00)

Results

References

External links
Results

Men's taijiquan